In taxonomy, Sulfitobacter is a genus of the Rhodobacteraceae.

Species
Sulfitobacter comprises the following species:
 Sulfitobacter aestuarii Park et al. 2018
 "Sulfitobacter algicola" Wang et al. 2021
 Sulfitobacter brevis Labrenz et al. 2000
 Sulfitobacter delicatus Ivanova et al. 2004
 Sulfitobacter donghicola Yoon et al. 2007
 Sulfitobacter dubius Ivanova et al. 2004
 Sulfitobacter faviae Kumari et al. 2016
 Sulfitobacter geojensis Kwak et al. 2014
 Sulfitobacter guttiformis (Labrenz et al. 2000) Yoon et al. 2007
 Sulfitobacter indolifex (Wagner-Döbler et al. 2004) Liu et al. 2017
 Sulfitobacter litoralis Park et al. 2007
 Sulfitobacter marinus Yoon et al. 2007
 Sulfitobacter maritimus Lian et al. 2021
 Sulfitobacter mediterraneus Pukall et al. 1999
 Sulfitobacter noctilucae Kwak et al. 2014
 Sulfitobacter noctilucicola Kwak et al. 2014
 Sulfitobacter pacificus Fukui et al. 2015
 Sulfitobacter pontiacus Sorokin 1996
 Sulfitobacter porphyrae Fukui et al. 2014
 Sulfitobacter profundi Song et al. 2020
 Sulfitobacter pseudonitzschiae Hong et al. 2015
 Sulfitobacter sabulilitoris Park et al. 2019
 Sulfitobacter salinus Yoon 2020
 "Sulfitobacter sediminilitoris" Park et al. 2020
 Sulfitobacter undariae Park et al. 2015

References

Scientific databases

External links

Bacteria genera
Rhodobacteraceae